Simon Onward Wood (born 24 September 1976) is an English former professional footballer who played in the Football League for Mansfield Town.

References

1976 births
Living people
English footballers
Association football forwards
English Football League players
Coventry City F.C. players
Rugby Town F.C. players
Mansfield Town F.C. players
Guiseley A.F.C. players